Otto Fischbeck (28 August 1865 – 23 May 1939) was a German liberal politician, member of the Prussian and German parliament and Prussian Minister of trade and commerce from 1918 to 1921.

Fischbeck was born in Güntershagen, Province of Pomerania, Kingdom of Prussia (Lubieszewo, Poland), he studied economics and administrative sciences at the Universities of Berlin and Greifswald.

From 1890 to 1895 he worked as a counsel at the chamber of commerce in Bielefeld and from 1895 to 1901 at the Employers Liability Insurance Association for paper processing industries in Berlin. From 1893 to 1895 he served as a town councillor in Bielefeld, and in 1900 Fischbeck became town councillor in Berlin. On 1 April 1918 he became the chairman of the municipal association of Greater Berlin.

From 1895 to 1903 and from 1907 to 1918 Fischbeck was a member of the German parliament and from 1903 to 1913 Member of the Prussian House of Representatives (Landtag). On 5 October 1918 he became the Prussian Minister for Trade and Commerce, a position he held until 1 November 1921.

Following World War I Fischbeck was a founding member of the Deutsche Demokratische Partei and was elected a member of the Weimar National Assembly (1919/20), he was again a member of the Prussian Landtag from 1921 to 1924 and was re-elected to the Reichstag in 1924 and 1928. He left the Reichstag in 1932 and died in Berlin in 1939.

References

1865 births
1939 deaths
People from Drawsko County
People from the Province of Pomerania
University of Greifswald alumni
Humboldt University of Berlin alumni
Progressive People's Party (Germany) politicians
German Democratic Party politicians
Members of the Prussian House of Representatives
Members of the 9th Reichstag of the German Empire
Members of the 10th Reichstag of the German Empire
Members of the 12th Reichstag of the German Empire
Members of the 13th Reichstag of the German Empire
Members of the Weimar National Assembly
Members of the Reichstag of the Weimar Republic
Government ministers of Prussia
Trade ministers of Prussia